de Zoete is a surname. Notable people with the name include:

 Beryl de Zoete, English ballet dancer, orientalist, dance critic, and dance researcher
 Herman de Zoete, English cricketer
 Willem de Zoete, Dutch Admiral of the 17th century

Other 
 Barclays de Zoete Wedd, investment bank
 André Zoete, French wrestler

See also 
 Zoe (name)